Full Swing is a documentary series produced in a collaboration between Netflix and PGA Tour to give a behind-the-scenes look at the players and tournaments of the PGA Tour. In March 2023, Netflix renewed the series for a second season.

Cast 
 Jordan Spieth
 Justin Thomas
 Brooks Koepka
 Scottie Scheffler
 Ian Poulter
 Joel Dahmen
 Matt Fitzpatrick
 Dustin Johnson
 Tony Finau
 Collin Morikawa
 Sahith Theegala
 Rory McIlroy
 Cameron Young
 Rickie Fowler
 Mito Pereira

Episodes

References

External links 
 
 

2020s American documentary television series
2022 in golf
2023 American television series debuts
Documentary television series about sports
English-language Netflix original programming
Golf on television
Netflix original documentary television series
PGA Tour